Athens, New York, can refer to:
 Athens (town), New York
 Athens (village), New York

Not to be confused with Athens, Pennsylvania, which is near the New York border and part of the interstate Penn-York Valley.